Rob Ruha (born 1980), is a New Zealand musician from Wharekahika, Gisborne District. He debuted as a solo musician in 2013, and is known for his singles sung in te Reo Māori, including "Kalega" (2017), "Ka Mānu" (2019), "35" with Ka Hao (2021), and "Taera" (2021). Ruha worked as the music director for the Māori language version of the Walt Disney Pictures films Moana and The Lion King.

Biography

Ruha grew up in Wharekahika, Gisborne District. He is of Te Whānau-ā-Apanui and Ngāti Porou descent, and also has Ngāti Rangiteaorere and Tūhourangi ancestry. He grew up performing kapa haka, and as a teenager, Ruha moved to Porirua, Wellington, and was inspired to become a musician while attending Mana College. Ruha returned to Gisborne to complete high school, and at 17, won the Aotearoa Traditional Māori Performing Arts Festival (Te Matatini) award for Best Waiata Tira as a part of the Waihīrere Māori Club. In the year 2000, Ruha led his first kapa haka group, Tūranga Wahine Tūranga Tāne, who performed at Te Matatini, and by the next year began judging the competition.

In 2004, Ruha moved to Hawaii to manage the Aotearoa section of the Polynesian Cultural Center. In 2007, Ruha graduated with a master's degree in Mātauranga Māori.

One of Ruha's first releases was the song "Hotuhotu", which he recorded with Ria Hall, which became one of the most played songs in te reo Māori on New Zealand radios in 2011. During a 2012 trip to Hawaii to judge a kapa haka competition, Ruha performed as a solo musician for the first time. In 2013, he began working as a solo musician after receiving mentorship and guidance by musician Maisey Rika, releasing his solo debut single "Pōnga Rā" on Waitangi Day 2014. His debut extended play Tiki Tapu was recorded at a home studio in Hamurana on the shores of Lake Rotorua, and produced alongside Michael Barker of Split Enz. His debut album Pūmau followed shortly afterwards in 2015.

In 2016, Ruha worked as a music consultant and performer for the soundtrack of the Lee Tamahori-directed film Mahana, and in 2017 was the musical director for the Te Reo Māori translation of the Walt Disney Pictures film Moana. Ruha's second album Survivance, a soul and R&B collaboration with the Witch Dr., was led by the single "Kalega". The song's title is a Te Tai Rāwhiti Māori slang term meaning "too much".

In January 2020, Ruha produced released a live album of gospel waiata in te Reo, sung supergroup Mōhau. The album won the Te Māngai Pāho Mana Reo Award and the Best Worship Artist Te Kaipuoro Kairangi Toa award at the 2020 Aotearoa Music Awards. In 2021, the Ruha-produced Te Tai Rāwhiti choir Ka Hao released their debut single "35", which became a hit single in New Zealand, gaining popularity on TikTok during Te Wiki o te Reo Māori (Māori Language Week). Later that year, Ruha released his third studio album, entitled Preservation of Scenery. "35" and "Taera", a single from Preservation of Scenery, were two of the top 10 most commercially successful songs sung in Te Reo Māori for 2021.

In 2022, Ruha worked as the co-musical director of The Lion King Reo Māori (2022), alongside Pere Wihongi.

Personal life 

Ruha is married to music manager Cilla Ruha, who he met at high school. Together they have four children. His entire family speaks te reo Māori as their first language. He lives at Te Kaha in the Bay of Plenty.

Ruha practices raranga (traditional weaving) and painting, which he learnt from his grandmothers at the age of seven.

Discography

Studio albums

Extended plays

Singles

As lead artist

As featured artist

Notes

References

1980 births
21st-century New Zealand male singers
Living people
Māori-language singers
Music directors
New Zealand male singer-songwriters
New Zealand record producers
People educated at Mana College
People from Hicks Bay
Ngāti Porou people
Ngāti Rangiteaorere people
Te Whānau-ā-Apanui people
Tuhourangi people